is an autobahn in Germany.

The A 516 branches off the A 3 towards the center of Oberhausen. The northern terminus of the A 516 is also the western terminus of the A 2. After a 5 km journey, the autobahn is downgraded to the B 223 just after the junction Oberhausen-Eisenheim, 500 m short of the A 42. This is because the junction with the A 42 is not designed as a free-flowing autobahn-to-autobahn junction; rather, it is essentially a diamond interchange with one folded ramp.

The speed limit for the entirety of the A 516 is 100 km/h. The limit is reduced to 80 km/h nightly between 22:00 and 6:00. Traffic heading to CentrO on the weekends and around the holiday season regularly creates backups of up to 2 km.

Exit list

  
 Road continues as the B 3 towards Emmerich
 
 

 

   Road continues as the B 223 towards Oberhausen
|}

External links
 Autobahn Atlas: A516

516